Eamon Joseph O'Brien (September 10, 1915 – May 9, 1985) was an American actor and film director. His career spanned almost 40 years, and he won one Academy Award, two Golden Globe Awards, and two stars on the Hollywood Walk of Fame.

O'Brien was a character actor of American cinema, and performed in The Barefoot Contessa (1954) and Seven Days in May (1964), the former of which won him an Academy Award for Best Supporting Actor, the latter of which he received a nomination in the same category. His other notable films include The Hunchback of Notre Dame (1939), The Killers (1946), A Double Life (1947), White Heat (1949), D.O.A. (1950), The Hitch-Hiker (1953), Julius Caesar (1953), 1984 (1956), The Girl Can't Help It (1956), The Man Who Shot Liberty Valance (1962), Fantastic Voyage (1966), The Wild Bunch (1969), and The Other Side of the Wind (2018).

Early years
Born Eamon Joseph O'Brien in Brooklyn, New York, he was the seventh and youngest child of Agnes (née Baldwin) and James O'Brien. His parents were natives of Tallow, County Waterford, Ireland. His father died when he was four years old.

O'Brien performed magic shows for children in his neighborhood. He performed under the title, "Neirbo the Great" ("neirbo" being "O'Brien" spelled backwards). An aunt who taught high school English and speech took him to the theatre from an early age and he developed an interest in acting. He began acting in plays at school.

After attending Fordham University for six months, O'Brien went to Neighborhood Playhouse School of the Theatre on a scholarship. O'Brien studied for two years under such teachers as Sanford Meisner; his classmates included Betty Garrett. He said, "It was simply the best training in the world for a young actor, singer or dancer." He added, "What these teachers encouraged above all was getting your tools ready – your body, your voice, your speech."

O'Brien took classes with the Columbia Laboratory Players group, which emphasized training in Shakespeare.

Theatre
O'Brien began working in summer stock in Yonkers. He made his first Broadway appearance at age 21 in Daughters of Atreus.

He played a grave digger in Hamlet, went on tour with Parnell, then appeared in Maxwell Anderson's The Star Wagon, starring Lillian Gish and Burgess Meredith. In 1940 he appeared with Ruth Chatterton in John Van Druten's Leave Her to Heaven on Broadway. Twelve years later he appeared in the same writer's I've Got Sixpence.

Film actor
O'Brien's theatre work attracted the attention of Pandro Berman at RKO, who offered him a role as the romantic lead in The Hunchback of Notre Dame (1939).

He returned to Broadway to play Mercutio opposite Laurence Olivier and Vivien Leigh in Romeo and Juliet.

RKO offered O'Brien a long-term contract. His roles included A Girl, a Guy, and a Gob (1941) and Parachute Battalion (1941). The latter starred Nancy Kelly whom O'Brien would later marry, although the union lasted less than a year.

O'Brien made Obliging Young Lady with Eve Arden, and Powder Town. In May 1942, Universal bought out his contract with RKO so he could appear opposite Deanna Durbin in The Amazing Mrs. Holliday (1943). After this he joined the armed services.

World War II
During World War II, O'Brien served in the U.S. Army Air Forces and appeared in the Air Forces' Broadway play Winged Victory by Moss Hart. He appeared alongside Red Buttons, Karl Malden, Kevin McCarthy, Gary Merrill, Barry Nelson, and Martin Ritt. When the play was filmed in 1944, O'Brien reprised his stage performance, co-starring with Judy Holliday. He toured in the production for two years, appearing alongside a young Mario Lanza.

Warner Bros.
In 1948, O'Brien signed a long-term contract with Warner Bros., who cast him in the screen version of Lillian Hellman's Another Part of the Forest. This starred Fredric March, who also appeared with O'Brien in An Act of Murder (1948).

He was then cast as the undercover police officer in White Heat (1949) opposite James Cagney. "He [Cagney] said he had only one rule," O'Brien noted. "He would tap his heart and he would say, "Play it from here, kid." He always did and I believe it's the best rule for any performer. He could play a scene 90 ways and never repeat himself. He did this to keep himself fresh. I try to do this whenever possible."

In 1949, 3,147 members of the Young Women's League of America, a national charitable organisation of spinsters, voted that O'Brien had more "male magnetism" than any other man in America today. "All women adore ruggedness," said organisation President Shirley Connolly. "Edmund O'Brien's magnetic appearance and personality most fully stir women's imaginative impulses. We're all agreed that he has more male magnetism than any of the 60,000,000 men in the United States today. (Runners up were Ezio Pinza, William O'Dwyer and Doak Walker.)

Following an appearance in Backfire (shot in 1948 but not released until 1950), his contract with Warner Bros. ended.

Freelance
O'Brien then made one of his most famous movies, D.O.A., where he plays a man investigating his own murder. He followed this with 711 Ocean Drive (1950). However his career then hit a slump. According to TCM, "In the early '50s, O'Brien started struggling with his weight, which could change significantly between films. He had no problems if that relegated him to character roles, but for a few years, "it was hard to come by anything really first rate."

"The funny thing about Hollywood is that they are interested in having you do one thing and do it well and do it ever after," said O'Brien. "That's the sad thing about being a leading man – while the rewards may be great in fame and finances, it becomes monotonous for an actor. I think that's why some of the people who are continually playing themselves are not happy."

He made some notable movies including two for Ida Lupino, The Hitch-Hiker and The Bigamist. He also played Casca in Joseph L. Mankiewicz's film of Julius Caesar (1953).

O'Brien worked heavily in television, on such shows as Pulitzer Prize Playhouse, Lux Video Theatre and Schlitz Playhouse of Stars. He announced plans to direct his own films.

In 1951 he was in a well-publicized brawl with Serge Rubinstein at a cafe.

From 1950 to 1952, O'Brien starred in the radio drama Yours Truly, Johnny Dollar, playing the title role. His other work in radio included Philip Morris Playhouse on Broadway.

Mankiewicz cast O'Brien in as press agent Oscar Muldoon in The Barefoot Contessa. O'Brien won a Best Supporting Actor Oscar for that role.

O'Brien followed this with a number of important roles, including Pete Kelly's Blues, 1984, A Cry in the Night (1956), and The Girl Can't Help It.

Television
O'Brien appeared extensively in television, including the 1957 live 90-minute broadcast on Playhouse 90 of The Comedian, a drama written by Rod Serling and directed by John Frankenheimer in which Mickey Rooney portrayed dictatorial television comedian Sammy Hogarth. O'Brien played Al Preston, the show's headwriter driven to the brink of insanity.  Burned out dealing with the volatle Hogarth, unable to come up with new material for the show's comedy sketches, Preston deliberately plagiarizes material authored by a young comedy writer who died in combat during World War II.  When the ruse is discovered, Preston is fired, but tells Hogarth his rages are rooted in his inability to find love.

In 1958 he directed and starred in a TV drama written by his brother, "The Town That Slept With the Lights On", about two Lancaster murders that so frightened the community that residents began sleeping with their lights on.

From 1959 to 1960, O'Brien portrayed the title role in the syndicated crime drama Johnny Midnight, about a New York City actor-turned-private detective. The producers refused to cast him unless he shed at least 50 pounds, so he went on a crash vegetarian diet and quit drinking.

"I seldom get very far away from crime," he recalled. "I've found it pays …  I tried non-crime films like Another Part of the Forest … good picture, good cast, but no good at the box office …  But you just put a gun in your hands and run through the streets doing cops and robbers and you're all set."

O'Brien also had his own production company, O'Brien-Frazen.

He made a French film, The Restless and the Damned for a fee more than $200,000. He was cast on the strength of his performance in The Girl Can't Help It and his Oscar.

O'Brien had roles on many television series, including an appearance on Target: The Corruptors!, The Eleventh Hour, Breaking Point and Mission: Impossible.

1960s film career

O'Brien walked off the set of The Last Voyage in protest at safety issues during the shoot. He later came back and found out he had been written out of the film. He was cast as a reporter in Lawrence of Arabia (1962), but had a heart attack during filming and was replaced by Arthur Kennedy.

O'Brien recovered to direct his first feature Man-Trap (1961) and appeared opposite Henry Fonda in The Longest Day (1962).

He continued to receive good roles: The Man Who Shot Liberty Valance (1962) and The Birdman of Alcatraz (1962).

In the mid-'60s, O'Brien co-starred with Roger Mobley and Harvey Korman in the "Gallegher" episodes of NBC's Walt Disney's Wonderful World of Color. From 1963 to 1965, he co-starred in the NBC legal drama Sam Benedict.

O'Brien had a choice role in Seven Days in May (1964) which saw him receive a second Oscar nomination.

"I've never made any kind of personality success," he admitted in a 1963 interview. "People never say 'that's an Eddie O'Brien part.' They say, 'That's a part Eddie O'Brien can play.'"

"I'd like to be able to say something important," he added. "To say something to people about their relationship with each other. If it touches just one guy, helps illustrate some points of view about living, then you've accomplished something."

O'Brien worked steadily throughout the late 1960s and early 1970s. However his memory problems were beginning to take their toll. A heart attack meant he had to drop out of The Glass Bottom Boat (1966).

Later career

"It would be awfully hard to do a series again," he said in a 1971 interview. "I wouldn't go for an hour show again. They don't have much of a chance against the movies."

He was a cast member of The Other Side of the Wind, Orson Welles' unfinished 1970s movie that finally was released in 2018.

In 1971, he was hospitalized with a "slight pulmonary condition."

His last works, both in 1974, were an episode of the television series Police Story and main role in the film 99 and 44/100% Dead.

Recording
In 1957 O'Brien recorded a spoken-word album of The Red Badge of Courage (Caedmon TC 1040). Billboard said, "Edmond O'Brien brings intensity in the narrative portions and successfully impersonates the varied characters in dialog."

Personal life
O'Brien was first married to actress Nancy Kelly from 1941 until 1942. He married his second wife, actress Olga San Juan in 1948. San Juan was the mother of his three children, including television producer Bridget O'Brien and actors Maria O'Brien and Brendan O'Brien. The marriage ended in a divorce in 1976.

Final years and death
In the late 1970s, O'Brien fell ill with Alzheimer's disease. In a 1983 interview, his daughter Maria remembers seeing her father in a straitjacket at a Veterans' Hospital: "He was screaming. He was violent. I remember noticing how thin he'd gotten. We didn't know, because for years he'd been sleeping with all his clothes on. We saw him a little later and he was walking around like all the other lost souls there."

Edmond O'Brien died on May 9, 1985, at St. Erne's Sanitorium in Inglewood, California of complications from Alzheimer's disease at age 69.

Walk of Fame
For his contribution to the motion picture industry, Edmond O'Brien has a star on the Hollywood Walk of Fame at 1725 Vine Street, and a second star at 6523 Hollywood Blvd. for his contribution to the television industry. Both were dedicated on February 8, 1960.

Biography

Complete filmography

Partial television credits

Theatre
 Hamlet (Oct 1936)
 Daughters of Atreus (Oct 1936)
 The Star Wagon (Sept 1937 – April 1938)
 Julius Caesar (May 1938)
 King Henry IV Part I (Jan–April 1939)
 Leave Her to Heaven (Feb–March 1940)
 Romeo and Juliet (May–June 1940)
 Winged Victory (Nov 1943 – May 1944)
 I've Got Sixpence (Dec 1952)

References

External links

 
 
 
 

1915 births
1985 deaths
20th-century American male actors
American male film actors
American male radio actors
American male stage actors
American male television actors
American people of Irish descent
Best Supporting Actor Academy Award winners
Best Supporting Actor Golden Globe (film) winners
Deaths from dementia in California
Deaths from Alzheimer's disease
Film directors from New York City
First Motion Picture Unit personnel
Fordham University alumni
Male Western (genre) film actors
Male actors from New York City
People from Greater Los Angeles
RKO Pictures contract players
Warner Bros. contract players